Aaru Arbang is a village development committee in Gorkha District in the Gandaki Zone of northern-central Nepal. At the time of the 1991 Nepal census, the total population of the village was 5,012.

References

Populated places in Gorkha District